Rubus trichomallus is a Latin American species of brambles in the rose family. It grows in southern Mexico, Colombia, and Central America.

Rubus trichomallus is a shrub several meters tall, with curved prickles and copious hairs. Leaves are compound with 3 or 5 leaflets. Fruits are red at first, nearly black when fully ripe.

References

trichomallus
Flora of Central America
Flora of Colombia
Flora of Mexico
Plants described in 1839